The Ministry of Culture and Arts (et des Arts) is the Algerian government ministry which oversees the protection and enhancement of Algeria's cultural heritage. Its head office is in Kouba, Algiers Province.

References

External links
 Ministry of Culture and Arts

Culture